Lucia is an unincorporated community in Gaston County, North Carolina, United States, approximately  east of the town of Stanley.

The Andrew Carpenter House, near Lucia, was listed on the National Register of Historic Places in 1983.

References

Unincorporated communities in North Carolina
Unincorporated communities in Gaston County, North Carolina